Merrydale is an unincorporated area and census-designated place (CDP) in East Baton Rouge Parish, Louisiana, United States. The population was 9,772 at the 2010 census, down from 10,427 in 2000. It is part of the Baton Rouge Metropolitan Statistical Area.

Geography
Merrydale is located in central East Baton Rouge Parish at  (30.504289, -91.116195). It is bordered to the south and west by Baton Rouge. U.S. Route 190, the Airline Highway, forms part of the southwest border of the community, and Louisiana Highway 37 (Greenwell Springs Road) forms part of the southern boundary.

Demographics

As of the 2020 United States census, there were 9,227 people, 2,901 households, and 2,026 families residing in the CDP.

As of the census of 2000, there were 10,427 people, 3,284 households, and 2,666 families residing in the CDP. The racial makeup of the CDP was 8.70% White, 90.18% African American, 0.09% Native American, 0.17% Asian, 0.20% from other races, and 0.66% from two or more races. Hispanic or Latino of any race were 0.90% of the population.

There were 3,284 households, out of which 47.3% had children under the age of 18 living with them, 46.0% were married couples living together, 30.1% had a female householder with no husband present, and 18.8% were non-families. 16.4% of all households were made up of individuals, and 4.9% had someone living alone who was 65 years of age or older. The average household size was 3.15 and the average family size was 3.52.

In the CDP, the population was spread out, with 34.6% under the age of 18, 10.9% from 18 to 24, 26.8% from 25 to 44, 20.9% from 45 to 64, and 6.8% who were 65 years of age or older. The median age was 29 years. For every 100 females, there were 87.3 males. For every 100 females age 18 and over, there were 79.0 males.

The median income for a household in the CDP was $28,544, and the median income for a family was $30,289. Males had a median income of $27,745 versus $19,518 for females. The per capita income for the CDP was $10,664. About 28.6% of families and 31.6% of the population were below the poverty line, including 42.7% of those under age 18 and 26.7% of those age 65 or over.

Education
East Baton Rouge Parish Public Schools serves Merrydale.

There are three elementary schools serving sections of Merrydale: Merrydale Elementary School, serving the central part; Glen Oaks Park Elementary, serving the northern part; and Celerity Lanier Elementary, serving the southern part.  Lanier is under control of the Recovery School District (RSD), and so Merrydale Elementary, directly controlled by EBR Parish Schools, is an option for Lanier areas.

Glen Oaks Middle School in Baton Rouge is the zoned middle school.  it is under control of the RSD, and therefore students may also attend North Banks Middle School, directly controlled by EBR Schools. Glen Oaks High School in Merrydale serves high school students.

References

External links
 Glen Oaks Park Elementary School
 Merrydale Elementary School
 Celerity Lanier Charter School

Census-designated places in East Baton Rouge Parish, Louisiana
Census-designated places in Louisiana
Baton Rouge metropolitan area